Joseph Desmond O'Connor (10 December 1919 – 15 July 1998) was a British linguist and Professor of Phonetics at University College London.
A festschrift in his honor edited by Jack Windsor Lewis, was published by Routledge in 1995.

Books
 O’Connor, J. D. (1967). Better English pronunciation (rev. 1980). Cambridge University Press
 O’Connor, J. D. (1971). Advanced phonetic reader. Cambridge University Press
 O’Connor, J. D. (1973). Phonetics. Penguin
 O’Connor, J. D., & Arnold, G. F. (1961). The intonation of colloquial English. Longman
 O’Connor, J. D., & Arnold, G. F. (1973). The intonation of colloquial English (2nd ed.). Longman
 O’Connor, J. D., & Fletcher, C. (1989). Sounds English. Longman

See also
Daniel Jones (phonetician)
A. C. Gimson

References

1919 births
1998 deaths
Linguists from England
British phonologists
Phoneticians
Linguists of English
People from Harrogate
Linguists of French
Linguists of Danish
Academics of University College London